The Flame of the Yukon is a 1926 American silent Northwoods adventure drama film starring Seena Owen and directed by George Melford. The film is based on a story by Monte Katterjohn and was distributed by Cecil DeMille's Producers Distributing Corporation. The film is a remake of a 1917 film that had starred Dorothy Dalton, which survives at the Library of Congress.

Cast
Seena Owen as The Flame
Arnold Gray as George Fowler
Matthew Betz as Black Jack Hovey
Jack McDonald as Sour Dough Joe
Vadim Uraneff as Solo Jim
Winifred Greenwood as Dolly

Preservation

The Flame of the Yukon, once thought to be lost, is preserved at the UCLA Film and Television Archive.

References

External links

Lobby card at Getty Images

American silent feature films
Films directed by George Melford
1920s adventure drama films
American adventure drama films
American black-and-white films
1920s rediscovered films
Producers Distributing Corporation films
Rediscovered American films
1920s American films
Silent American drama films
Silent adventure drama films
1920s English-language films